This is a list of official sports governing bodies, federations and associations in China. All governing bodies are led by or under supervision of General Administration of Sports of China (or All-China Sports Federation).

Organizations

References 

 
Sports governing bodies